Percival Street is a street in the East Point and Happy Valley, Hong Kong Island, Hong Kong. The street spans from Gloucester Road in the north to Leighton Road in the south. Between Hennessy Road and Leighton Road, the street is with a branch of Hong Kong Tramways leading to Happy Valley. It is estimated that on average the annual rent per square feet for retailing here is US$2300 annually on average, second to US$2500 in Fifth Avenue, United States. It is also one of the major streets occupied during Occupy movement in 2014.

History
The road was named after Alexander Perceval, a 19th-century tai-pan of Jardine Matheson. The land of the present-day Times Square was a tram depot at Matheson Street. Trams returned to the depot via Perceval Street and Russell Street. Another historical building was the Lee Theatre. It was later demolished to build Lee Theatre Plaza shopping mall.

Shopping
Apart from Lee Theatre Plaza, two shopping centres Causeway Bay Plaza 1 and Causeway Bay Plaza 2 are also located along the road.

See also
 List of streets and roads in Hong Kong

References

Causeway Bay
East Point, Hong Kong
Roads on Hong Kong Island